Rytec Corporation is an American manufacturer of high-cycle, high-speed doors for industrial and commercial applications. Headquartered in Jackson, Wisconsin, Rytec is considered a North American leader in the development, manufacture and sale of high-performance doors.

Overview 

In 1985, Paul Reilly Jr. founded Rytec Corporation in Addison, Illinois. Under a license agreement with Labex GmbH (which later became a division of the Hörmann Group), Rytec manufactured and sold high-speed folding doors in the United States. Widespread adoption of this product in cold storage environments helped establish the viability of the high-speed door concept in North America. In 1987, Rytec moved to a larger facility on Eagle Drive in Jackson, Wisconsin. Several years later, in 1990, Rytec developed the first high-speed rolling door that could withstand accidental impacts and reset without tools.

Donald P. Grasso and Fred L. Turner purchased Rytec Corporation in 1994. In 1996, Rytec built a new a facility on Cedar Parkway in Jackson, Wisconsin, which was subsequently expanded in 2001 and 2006. This expanded facility increased manufacturing capacity and included a research and development facility with a wind tunnel for door testing. , Don Grasso is the principal shareholder, Chairman and CEO.

In January 2018, Rytec purchased the former Steel Craft building in Hartford, Wisconsin, which signals a major product expansion.

Recognition 
In 1994, the Wisconsin Society of Professional Engineers presented Rytec with the Governor's New Products Award. That same year, the company received its first of 5 Plant Engineering magazine's Product of the Year awards for product innovation. It was recognized in Professional Door Dealer magazine's Best of Business poll as Best High-Speed Doors in 2010, 2011 and 2012; Best Green Products in 2011; and Most Innovative Products in 2012.

References

External links
 

Manufacturing companies based in Wisconsin